Maksym Hryhorovych Sutula (born 10 December 1987) is a Ukrainian football striker.

Club history
Dmytro Zayko began his football career in CYSS Chornobai in Chornobai. He signed with FC Kremin Kremenchuk during 2007 summer transfer window.

Career statistics

References

External links
  Profile – Official Kremin site
  FC Kremin Kremenchuk Squad on the PFL website
  Profile on the FFU website

1987 births
Living people
FC Kremin Kremenchuk players
Ukrainian footballers
Association football forwards